Sursee railway station is a railway station in the municipality of Sursee, in the Swiss canton of Lucerne. It is an intermediate stop on the standard gauge Olten–Lucerne line of Swiss Federal Railways. The freight-only Sursee–Triengen line diverges from the Olten–Lucerne line just north of the station.

Services 
The following services stop at Sursee:

 InterRegio:

References

External links 
 
 

Railway stations in the canton of Lucerne
Swiss Federal Railways stations